Five children of Iblis are mentioned throughout tafsir (Quranic exegesis) on Surah 18:50, each a devil (shaiṭān) assigned to a specific task to do evil. Their names are: Dasim, Awar, Sut, Thabar or Theber, and Zalanpur or Zalinbor. They reproduce by laying eggs.

Functions 
 Dasim: Its name is derived from the root (Dasama =Lipid): His mission is to enter people's homes and cause problems between family members, and between the woman and her husband. And eat with them too. He enters the houses if the man does not salute (the greeting of Islam) the people of his house.
 Aawar: The name means 'one-eyed' in Arabic. He is responsible for adultery or fornication (Zina). It incites people to do it, and makes it beautiful in their eyes.
 Misout: He is responsible for the noise, and the false news that he throws on people's mouths, and they find no basis for it.
 Thabar or Theber: He is responsible for the calamities, who commands to slap the cheeks, and to return to ignorance (the pre-Islamic era: Jahiliyyah).
 Zalanpur or Zalinbor: He is charged with causing division among people, and making a man see the faults of his wife, and he is present in the markets, who places his head in every market between heaven and earth. Because of it, people are still complaining.

References 

Islamic legendary creatures
Demons in Islam
Islamic belief and doctrine